Xaver Schlager (born 28 September 1997) is an Austrian footballer who plays as midfielder for Bundesliga club RB Leipzig and the Austria national team.

Club career

Red Bull Salzburg
After playing for the youth team of SC St. Valentin, Schlager joined the FC Red Bull Salzburg Academy in 2011, where he played in all teams. In 2015, he was transferred to FC Liefering, the feeder team of FC Red Bull Salzburg.

During the 2017–18 season, Salzburg had their best ever European campaign. They finished top of their Europa League group, for a record fourth time, before beating Real Sociedad and Borussia Dortmund thus making their first ever appearance in the UEFA Europa League semi-final. On 3 May 2018, he played in the Europa League semi-finals as Marseille beat Salzburg 3–2 on aggregate to secure a place in the final.

VfL Wolfsburg
On the 26 June 2019, Schlager signed for Bundesliga club VfL Wolfsburg. During his time with Wolfsburg,  Schlager made 81 appearances in all competitions, including 69 in the Bundesliga. He missed 20 league matches through injury during his final season, but still averaged 27 pressures per game whilst producing a goal and two assists.

RB Leipzig
On 17 June 2022, Schlager joined Bundesliga rivals RB Leipzig, after the club activated a release clause in his Wolfsburg contract. He signed a contract until 2026.

International career
Schlager played for the Austrian U16, U17 and U19 national team. With Austria U19 he played at the 2015 UEFA European Under-19 Championship. He made his debut for the senior team in a friendly 3–0 win over Slovenia on 23 March 2018.

Career statistics

Club

International

International goals

Scores and results list Austria's goal tally first, score column indicates score after each Schlager goal.

Honours
Red Bull Salzburg
 Austrian Bundesliga: 2015–16, 2016–17, 2017–18, 2018–19
 Austrian Cup: 2015–16, 2016–17, 2018–19

References

External links

 Profile at the RB Leipzig website
 
 OFB Profile
 
 

1997 births
Living people
Footballers from Linz
Association football midfielders
Austrian footballers
Austria youth international footballers
Austria under-21 international footballers
Austria international footballers
FC Liefering players
FC Red Bull Salzburg players
VfL Wolfsburg players
VfL Wolfsburg II players
RB Leipzig players
Austrian Football Bundesliga players
2. Liga (Austria) players
Bundesliga players
Regionalliga players
UEFA Euro 2020 players
Austrian expatriate footballers
Austrian expatriate sportspeople in Germany
Expatriate footballers in Germany